The inaugural election to South Pembrokeshire District Council was held in April 1973. Independent candidates won nearly all the seats. It was  followed by the 1976 election. On the same day there were elections to the other local authorities and community councils in Wales.

Results

Amroth (one seat)

Angle (one seat)

Begelly (one seat)

Carew (one seat)

Cosheston(one seat)

Hundleton (one seat)

Lampeter Velfrey (one seat)

Maenclochog (one seat)

Manorbier(one seat)

Martletwy and Slebech (one seat)

Narberth North / South (one seat)

Narberth Urban (one seat)

Pembroke Central (two seats)

Pembroke East (three seats)

Pembroke Llanion (two seats)

Pembroke Market (two seats)

Pembroke Pennar (two seats)

Penally(one seat)

St Issels (two seats)

Tenby North (two seats)

Tenby South (two seats)

References

1973
1973 Welsh local elections